Altica caerulea is a species of flea beetle. It is a pest of millets such as sorghum in India.

References

Alticini
Insect pests of millets